Chromosome 6  is one of the 23 pairs of chromosomes in humans. People normally have two copies of this chromosome. Chromosome 6 spans more than 172 million base pairs (the building material of DNA) and represents between 5.5 and 6% of the total DNA in cells.  It contains the major histocompatibility complex, which contains over 100 genes related to the immune response, and plays a vital role in organ transplantation.

The evolution of human centromere 6 
The centromere of chromosome 6 illustrates an interesting example of centromere evolution. It was known that in a Catarrhini ancestor the chromosome 6 centromere was situated near position 26 Mb of the modern human chromosome. In Macaca mulatta, this old centromere went defunct and repositioned to a different chromosomal location. In case of humans, the old centromere went defunct and a more recent form emerged near the modern position of human cen6 (size of 60 Mb). Such cases are known as Evolutionary New Centromeres (ENC). This assembly phenomenon of the human chromosome 6 gives researchers an opportunity to investigate the origin of the ENC on chromosome 6.

Genes
The human leukocyte antigen lies on chromosome 6, with the exception of the gene for β2-microglobulin (which is located on chromosome 15), and encodes cell-surface antigen-presenting proteins among other functions.

Number of genes
In 2003, the entirety of chromosome 6 was manually annotated for proteins, resulting in the identification of 1,557 genes, and 633 pseudogenes.

The following are some of the newer gene count estimates. Because researchers use different approaches to genome annotation their predictions of the number of genes on each chromosome varies (for technical details, see gene prediction). Among various projects, the collaborative consensus coding sequence project (CCDS) takes an extremely conservative strategy. So CCDS's gene number prediction represents a lower bound on the total number of human protein-coding genes.

Gene list 

The following is a partial list of genes on human chromosome 6. For complete list, see the link in the infobox on the right.

p-arm
The following are some of the genes located on p-arm (short arm) of human chromosome 6:

q-arm
The following are some of the genes located on q-arm (long arm) of human chromosome 6:

Diseases and disorders
The following diseases are some of those related to genes on chromosome 6:

 ankylosing spondylitis, HLA-B
 collagenopathy, types II and XI
 Coeliac disease HLA-DQA1 & DQB1
 Ehlers-Danlos syndrome, classical, hypermobility, and Tenascin-X types
 Hashimoto's thyroiditis
 hemochromatosis
 Hemochromatosis type 1
 21-hydroxylase deficiency
 maple syrup urine disease
 methylmalonic acidemia
 Autosomal nonsyndromic deafness
 North Carolina macular dystrophy
 otospondylomegaepiphyseal dysplasia
 Parkinson disease
 polycystic kidney disease
 porphyria
 porphyria cutanea tarda
 Rheumatoid arthritis, HLA-DR
 CIRS (Chronic Inflammatory Response Syndrome ), Sick Building Syndrome, Mold Toxin Susceptibility / Poisoning, HLA-DR/DQ 
 Spinocerebellar ataxia type 1, ATXN1
 Stickler syndrome, COL11A2
 Systemic lupus erythematosus
 Diabetes mellitus type 1, HLA-DR, DQA1 & DQB1
 X-linked sideroblastic anemia
 Epilepsy
 Guillain Barre Syndrome
 Chordoma
 Hepatocellular carcinoma
 Schizophrenia

Cytogenetic band

References

Notes
Some text in this article was taken from http://ghr.nlm.nih.gov/chromosome=6  (public domain)

Further reading

External links

 
 
 "Chromosome 6 Research Project". Parent-driven research for genotype-phenotype studies on chromosome 6 disorders. Retrieved 2017-06-17

Chromosomes (human)